St. Sebastian River Preserve State Park is a Florida State Park, located three miles north of Fellsmere.

See also
 St. Sebastian River
 Hernández–Capron Trail

External links
 St. Sebastian River Preserve State Park at Florida State Parks
 U.S. Geological Survey Map at the U.S. Geological Survey Map Website. Retrieved January 18, 2023.

State parks of Florida
Parks in Brevard County, Florida
Parks in Indian River County, Florida